Hibberts Corner is a village within the town of Washington in Knox County, Maine, United States.  It is located at  (44.3042402, -69.4072655), at an altitude of 354 feet (108 m).

References

Villages in Maine
Villages in Knox County, Maine